Aforia multispiralis is a species of sea snail, a marine gastropod mollusk in the family Cochlespiridae.

Description
The size of an adult shell varies between 40 mm and 90 mm.

Distribution
This species is found in the cold waters of the South Orkneys, the South Shetland Islands, Kerguelen Island and the Antarctic Peninsula.

References

 Bozzetti L. (1997) Description of a new genus and a new species (Gastropoda: Turridae, Turriculinae) from the Kerguelen Islands, southern Indian Ocean / Descrizione di un nuovo genere ed una nuova specie (Gastropoda: Turridae, Turriculinae) dalle Isole Kerguelen, Oceano Indiano meridionale. World Shells 23: 42–44
 Wiese V. (2001) Comments on a "new" turrid species from Kerguelen. Schriften zur Malakozoologie 18: 33–34.

External links
 

multispiralis
Gastropods described in 1990